Neal Karlen is an American journalist and non-fiction writer currently living in Minneapolis.

Early life
Karlen grew up in a Jewish family in Minneapolis, Minnesota, and attended St. Louis Park High School.
  He studied Yiddish at Brown University.

Career
Karlen has been a contributing author to many well-known magazines, including Newsweek, The New York Times, and Rolling Stone.

He is the author of eight books, and he teaches non-fiction writing at the University of Minnesota's Graduate School of Journalism.

List of books 
 Take My Life, Please! - Henny Youngman (1991) 
 The Babe in Boyland (1995) 
 Babes in Toyland: The Making and Selling of a Rock and Roll Band (1995) 
 Jen-X: Jenny McCarthy's Open Book (1997) 
 Slouching Toward Fargo: A Two-Year Saga Of Sinners And St. Paul Saints At The Bottom Of The Bush Leagues With Bill Murray, Darryl Strawberry, Dakota Sadie And Me (1999) 
 Shanda: The Making and Breaking of a Self-loathing Jew (2004) Simon and Schuster. 
 The Story of Yiddish: How a Mish-Mosh of Languages Saved the Jews (2009) HarperCollins. 
 Augie's Secrets: The Minneapolis Mob and the King of the Hennepin Strip, (2013) Minnesota Historical Society Press. 
 This Thing Called Life: Prince's Odyssey On + Off the Record, (2020) MacMillan Publishers/St. Martin's Press.

Anthologies 

 Under Purple Skies: The Minneapolis Anthology; Frank Bures, Ed., Belt Publishing, 2019. Reprint of a 1985 Rolling Stone cover story on Minneapolis. 
 Rolling Stone’s The 90’s: The Inside Stories, anthology collected by the editors of Rolling Stone, HarperCollins (2010), reprint of 1990 cover story on Prince. 
 Fishing With My Father: A Literary Companion, edited by Peter Kaminsky, Penguin Publishers, 2005, two previously published essays from The New York Times. 
 The Complete Armchair Book of Baseball: An All-Star Lineup Celebrates America’s National Pastime, Scribner publishers, 2004; edited by John Thorn, introduction by Commissioner A. Bartlett Giamatti; reprint of piece, “The Bad Nose Bees,” originally published in Rolling Stone, in an anthology of baseball writing from the Civil War to the present. 
 The Armchair Book of Baseball, Volume II; (Scribner, 1997; John Thorn, ed.) 
 The Indiana Review, University of Indiana, 1995, fiction, “The Power of the Just-Dead;” in the national literary magazine;
 The Best American Sportswriting 1994 (Houghton Mifflin, 1994; Glenn Stout, ed.) Cited for Village Voice feature article on Willie Mays.

Awards 
Neal was the recipient of the CASEY Award in 1999 for his book Slouching Toward Fargo.

References 

Year of birth missing (living people)
Living people
American journalists
Non-fiction writers about organized crime in the United States
Organized crime in Minnesota
Organized crime writers